Arthur Thomas Ashwell (8 February 1853 – 30 September 1925) was an English cricketer who played for Nottinghamshire. He was a right-handed batsman. He was born in Nottingham and died in Canterbury, Kent.

Ashwell made just two first-class appearances for Nottinghamshire during the 1876 season, and in the two innings in which he batted, he failed to score a run.

Ashwell's brother, Charles, made one first-class appearance in 1870.

External links
Arthur Ashwell at Cricket Archive 

1853 births
1925 deaths
English cricketers
Nottinghamshire cricketers
Cricketers from Nottingham
People educated at Rugby School